The following outline is provided as an overview of and topical guide to Guyana:

Guyana – previously known as British Guiana, is the only nation state of the Commonwealth of Nations on the mainland of South America.  Bordered to the east by Suriname, to the south and southwest by Brazil and to the west by Venezuela, it is the third-smallest country on the mainland of South America. It is one of four non-Spanish-speaking territories on the continent, along with the countries of Brazil (Portuguese), Suriname (Dutch) and the French overseas region of French Guiana (French).

General reference

 Pronunciation:  or 
 Common English country name: Guyana
 Official English country name:  The Co-operative Republic of Guyana
 Common endonym(s):  Guyana
 Official endonym(s): The Co-operative Republic of Guyana
 Adjectival(s): Guyanese (disambiguation)
 Demonym(s):
 Etymology : Name of Guyana
 ISO country codes: GY, GUY, 328
 ISO region codes: See ISO 3166-2:GY
 Internet country code top-level domain: .gy

Geography of Guyana 

Geography of Guyana
 Guyana is: a country
 Location:
 Northern Hemisphere
 Western Hemisphere
 South America
 Time zone:  UTC-04
 Extreme points of Guyana
 High:  Mount Roraima 
 Low:  North Atlantic Ocean 0 m
 Land boundaries:  2,949 km
 1,606 km
 743 km
 600 km
 Coastline:  North Atlantic Ocean 459 km
 Population of Guyana: 744,962 (Jul. 2018 estimate) - 161th most populous country

 Area of Guyana: 214,999 km2
 Atlas of Guyana

Environment of Guyana 

 Climate of Guyana
 Renewable energy in Guyana
 Wildlife of Guyana
 Fauna of Guyana
 Birds of Guyana
 Mammals of Guyana

Natural geographic features of Guyana 
 Islands of Guyana
 Rivers of Guyana
 Valleys of Guyana
 World Heritage Sites in Guyana: None

Regions of Guyana

Ecoregions of Guyana 

List of ecoregions in Guyana

Administrative divisions of Guyana 
Administrative divisions of Guyana
 Regions of Guyana
 Neighborhood Councils of Guyana

Regions of Guyana 

Regions of Guyana

Neighborhood Councils of Guyana 

Neighborhood Councils of Guyana

Municipalities of Guyana 
 Capital of Guyana: Georgetown
 Cities of Guyana

Demography of Guyana 
Demographics of Guyana

Government and politics of Guyana 
Politics of Guyana
 Form of government: parliamentary representative democratic republic
 Capital of Guyana: Georgetown
 Elections in Guyana
 Political parties in Guyana

Branches of the government of Guyana 

Government of Guyana

Executive branch of the government of Guyana 
 Head of state and head of government: President of Guyana, Irfaan Ali

Legislative branch of the government of Guyana 
 National Assembly (unicameral)

Judicial branch of the government of Guyana 

Court system of Guyana

Foreign relations of Guyana 

Foreign relations of Guyana
 Diplomatic missions in Guyana
 Diplomatic missions of Guyana

International organization membership 
The Co-operative Republic of Guyana is a member of:

African, Caribbean, and Pacific Group of States (ACP)
Agency for the Prohibition of Nuclear Weapons in Latin America and the Caribbean (OPANAL)
Caribbean Development Bank (CDB)
Commonwealth of Nations
Council of the Baltic Sea States (CBSS)
Food and Agriculture Organization (FAO)
Group of 77 (G77)
Inter-American Development Bank (IADB)
International Bank for Reconstruction and Development (IBRD)
International Civil Aviation Organization (ICAO)
International Criminal Court (ICCt)
International Criminal Police Organization (Interpol)
International Development Association (IDA)
International Federation of Red Cross and Red Crescent Societies (IFRCS)
International Finance Corporation (IFC)
International Fund for Agricultural Development (IFAD)
International Labour Organization (ILO)
International Maritime Organization (IMO)
International Monetary Fund (IMF)
International Olympic Committee (IOC)
International Organization for Migration (IOM) (observer)
International Organization for Standardization (ISO) (subscriber)
International Red Cross and Red Crescent Movement (ICRM)

International Telecommunication Union (ITU)
International Trade Union Confederation (ITUC)
Latin American Economic System (LAES)
Multilateral Investment Guarantee Agency (MIGA)
Nonaligned Movement (NAM)
Organisation of Islamic Cooperation (OIC)
Organisation for the Prohibition of Chemical Weapons (OPCW)
Organization of American States (OAS)
Permanent Court of Arbitration (PCA)
Rio Group (RG)
Union of South American Nations (UNASUR)
United Nations (UN)
United Nations Conference on Trade and Development (UNCTAD)
United Nations Educational, Scientific, and Cultural Organization (UNESCO)
United Nations Industrial Development Organization (UNIDO)
Universal Postal Union (UPU)
World Confederation of Labour (WCL)
World Customs Organization (WCO)
World Federation of Trade Unions (WFTU)
World Health Organization (WHO)
World Intellectual Property Organization (WIPO)
World Meteorological Organization (WMO)
World Trade Organization (WTO)

Law and order in Guyana 
Law of Guyana

 Guyana Police Force
 Cannabis in Guyana
 Constitution of Guyana
 Crime in Guyana
 Human rights in Guyana
 LGBT rights in Guyana
 Freedom of religion in Guyana

Military of Guyana 
Military of Guyana
 Command
 Commander-in-chief:
 Forces
 Army of Guyana
 Navy of Guyana
 Air Force of Guyana
 Military ranks of Guyana

Local government in Guyana 

Local government in Guyana

History of Guyana 

History of Guyana
Timeline of the history of Guyana
Current events of Guyana

Culture of Guyana 
Culture of Guyana
 Cuisine of Guyana
 Languages of Guyana
 National symbols of Guyana
 Coat of arms of Guyana
 Flag of Guyana
 National anthem of Guyana
 People of Guyana
 Prostitution in Guyana
 Public holidays in Guyana
 Religion in Guyana
 Christianity in Guyana
 Hinduism in Guyana
 Islam in Guyana
 Sikhism in Guyana
 World Heritage Sites in Guyana: None

Art in Guyana 
 Literature of Guyana
 Music of Guyana

Sports in Guyana 
Sports in Guyana
 Football in Guyana
Guyana at the Olympics

Economy and infrastructure of Guyana 
Economy of Guyana
 Economic rank, by nominal GDP (IMF 2020 estimate) : 148th (one hundred and forty eighth)
 Agriculture in Guyana
Banking in Guyana
 Communications in Guyana
 Internet in Guyana
 Companies of Guyana
Currency of Guyana: Dollar
ISO 4217: GYD
 Mining in Guyana
 Guyana Stock Exchange
 Transport in Guyana
 Airports in Guyana
 Rail transport in Guyana
 Water supply and sanitation in Guyana

Education in Guyana 
Education in Guyana

See also

Guyana
Index of Guyana-related articles
List of Guyana-related topics
List of international rankings
Member state of the Commonwealth of Nations
Member state of the United Nations
Outline of geography
Outline of South America

References

External links

 Government
President of the Co-operative Republic of Guyana - Official Website
Encyclopædia Britannica - Guyana Country Page
National Assembly
Official Website of the Guyana Tourism Authority (GTA)
Official Website of the Guyana Office for Investment - GO-Invest
Ministry of Health 
Declassified US State Department documents detailing covert action from the start of postwar independence

 General

SDNP Guyana - Guyanese directory and host to ministerial sites
 Guyana YellowPages - Guyana online Yellow Pages business directory.

Hinduism in Guyana and Suriname
Map of Guyana - Tourist Destinations
Guyana International Travel Information - U.S. State Department Consular Information Sheet for Guyana with entry requirements and travel information and warnings
Guyana. The World Factbook. Central Intelligence Agency.

 News media
Guyanese Christian Association of Canada
Guyana News and Information One of the most popular websites for current news and information, this site also hosts an email directory of people from the Guyanese Community and Discussion Forum.
GINA - Government Information Agency. Updated daily.
The Guyana Chronicle - Local daily government run newspaper.
Kaieteur news - Local daily independent newspaper.
Stabroek News - Local daily independent newspaper. Updated daily and maintains archives for 7 days.
Voice of Guyana International - independent owned Internet radio
- BBC Caribbean News Guyana Suicide rates.

 Map
 Guyana on Google Maps.

Guyana